Physetica sequens is a species of moth of the family Noctuidae. It is endemic to New Zealand and can be found throughout the North and South Islands. It appears to be more common in the North Island than the South Island, and lives in open native shrublands, peatlands, Northland gumland, inland volcanic dunes, and Dracophyllum-dominated areas at altitudes that range from sea level to the alpine zone, up to at least 1600 m. Larvae of this species have been successfully reared on Leucopogon fasciculatus and Leptecophylla juniperina. The adults of this species are variable in appearance and are on the wing from September to March. P. sequens is similar in appearance to P. phricias but can be distinguished as P. phricias has a narrow black line along the dorsum of its forewing that P. sequens does not.  P. sequens is also similar in appearance to P. cucullina however the forewing dorsum area of P. sequens does not have the narrow black line that is frequently present on P. cucullina forewings.

Taxonomy 
This species was first described by George Howes in 1912 using specimens collected by George Blundell Longstaff at Whakarewarewa and named the species Morrisonia sequens. In 1924 Edward Meyrick, thinking he was describing a new species, named this moth Melanchra distracta. In 1928 George Hudson discussed and illustrated this species under the name Melanchra sequens. He also discussed Melanchra distracta, also thinking it a separate species. In 1988 J. S. Dugdale placed this species in the genus Graphania and at the same time synonymised Melanchra distracta into that name.  In 2017 Robert Hoare undertook a review of New Zealand Noctuinae and placed this species in the genus Physetica. While reviewing this species Hoare designated a lectotype specimen, held at the Natural History Museum, London. The Auckland War Memorial Museum hold a paralectotype specimen of this species.

Description 

Hoare describes the larva of this species as follows:

Howes described the adults of this species as follows:

The adult wingspan of the male P. sequens is between 31 and 42 mm and for the female is between 32.5 and 44 mm. This species is variable in appearance with larger specimens being found in Tongariro National Park. However although these examples have less prominently underlined reniform stigma, Hoare considered them falling within the same species as there were no other distinguishing characteristics that might support separating them off. P. sequens is similar in appearance to P. phricias but can be distinguished as P. phricias has a narrow black line along the dorsum of its forewing that P. sequens does not.  P. sequens is also similar in appearance to P. cucullina however the forewing dorsum area of the former species does not have the narrow black line that is frequently present on P. cucullina forewings.

Distribution 
This species is endemic to New Zealand. It can be found throughout the North and South Islands.

Habitat 
This species lives in open native shrublands, peatlands, Northland gumland, inland volcanic dunes, and Dracophyllum-dominated areas at altitudes that range from sea level to the alpine zone, up to at least 1600 m. This species appears to be more common in the North Island than the South Island.

Behaviour 
Adults are on the wing from September to March.

Biology and host species 

Larvae of this species have been successfully reared on Leucopogon fasciculatus and Leptecophylla juniperina. Adults of P. sequens have been witnessed feeding on the flowers of as well as pollinating Dracophyllum acerosum.

References

Hadeninae
Moths of New Zealand
Endemic fauna of New Zealand
Moths described in 1912
Taxa named by George Howes (entomologist)
Endemic moths of New Zealand